The 2023 Paris Musketeers season is the inaugural season of the Paris Musketeers team in the European League of Football for the 2023 season.

Preseason
After the announcement of the long awaited franchise, the front office was presented. It consists of Patrick Butler, CFL Grey Cup winner Jason Johnson and John McKeon, all operating as directors. Further general manager Marc-Angelo Soumah and president Frantzy Dorlean are member of the board.

The head coach of the franchise for the first season will be former Vanderbilt Commodores' defensive secondary coach Marc Mattioli.

The first ever tryout camp of the team was organized on 20 November 2022 with around 240 French and international players in attendance in the Paris La Défense Arena. Shortly after, the first players were announced with French nationals Mamadou Sy and Mamadou Doumbouya, both having their origins from the national league champion La Courneuve Flash. Further building blocks of the roster consists of the first ever franchise quarterback Zach Edwards and wide receiver Kyle Sweet, both coming from the Barcelona Dragons.

Regular season

Standings

Roster

Staff

Notes

References 

Paris Musketeers
Paris Saints
Paris Saints